The Institut de Robòtica i Informàtica Industrial, CSIC-UPC (IRI) (in Spanish: Instituto de Robótica e Informática Industrial, in English: Institute of Robotics and Industrial Informatics), is a Joint Research Center of the Spanish National Research Council (CSIC) and the Polytechnical University of Catalonia (UPC). The Institute has three main objectives: to promote fundamental research in Robotics and Applied Informatics, to cooperate with the community in industrial technological projects, and to offer scientific education through graduate courses.

IRI conducts basic and applied research in human-centered robotics and automatic control. The Institute's lines of research are the following:
 Automatic control 
 Kinematics and robot design
 Mobile robotics
 Perception and manipulation

IRI was created in 1995, and currently is situated in the Mathematics and Statistics Faculty  of the Campus Sud of UPC, in Barcelona, Spain.

External links 
 IRI website
 Report 2009/2010

Robotics organizations
Research institutes in Catalonia
Robotics in Spain